Serdika Metro Station is an M1 and M4 lines station of Sofia Metro. It was put into operation on 31 October 2000. With the opening of Serdika II on 31 August 2012 the station became an interchange between the Red and Blue lines. However it is not a true interchange (such as platforms 3, 4, 5 and 6 of Canning Town station in London), but an interconnected station, in a similar manner to the Washington Metro's two Farragut stations.

The station is named after the ancient city of Serdica, as it lies in the very centre of the hitherto unearthed ruins of that city. These are located about six meters (20 feet) below ground and, along with the opening of Serdika II station, a large section of the old city has been exposed and is in full view both around and inside the two stations. 

Serdika is one of only three metro stations in the world where the same line passes through the station twice in a pretzel configuration, the others being the Monument Metro station on the Tyne and Wear Metro in Newcastle upon Tyne, England, and Voorweg RandstadRail station on the Randstadrail in The Hague, Netherlands.

Interchange with other public transport
Bus service: N1, N3, N4
Tramway service: 4, 5, 12, 18

Location

Gallery

References

External links

 360 degrees panorama from inside the station
 Sofia Metropolitan
 Unofficial site

Sofia Metro stations
Railway stations opened in 2000
2000 establishments in Bulgaria